Jochems is a surname. Notable people with this surname include:

 Annaleese Jochems (born 1994), New Zealand writer and bookseller
 Günter Jochems (1928–1991), German ice hockey player
 William D. Jochems (1886–1960), American judge